Priyanka Singh Rawat is an Indian politician who represents the Bharatiya Janata Party.

Early life
Rawat was born on 7 August 1985 at Bareilly, Uttar Pradesh, to Uttam Ram Singh and Prabha Singh. Uttam Ram is a retired Provincial Civil Service officer. She received a M.A. degree in political science from Mahatma Jyotiba Phule Rohilkhand University in 2007. She also received a postgraduate diploma in mass communication and electronic journalism from the same university in the following year.

Political career
Rawat participated in youth politics during her university days. She was elected library incharge at that time.

In June 2013, Rawat joined the Bharatiya Janata Party. On 16 March 2014, the party announced that Rawat would contest the upcoming general election from Barabanki constituency. She was elected to the Lok Sabha in May after defeating her nearest rival PL Punia of the Indian National Congress party by a margin of approximately 211,000 votes.
On 1 September 2014, she became a member of the Standing Committee on Food, Consumer Affairs and Public Distribution. She was appointed member of the Consultative Committee of the Ministry of Women and Child Development.

During 2014–2019, Priyanka Rawat started development work in the fields of agriculture, education, health and roads in Barabanki.  Priyanka had caught everyone's attention by raising the issue of an incomplete dam on Suratganj of Ramnagar on the banks of the Ghaghra River (now Saryu) in flood-affected Barabanki.  After this the dam started being built.
As MP, it was Priyanka's important achievement to repair roads and build new roads in Barabanki.  Priyanka's construction of National Highway-56, the road from Ramnagar to Rupidhia border in Barabanki on National Highway-28, was a significant achievement.  Apart from this, Priyanka included a dozen villages of Barabanki in Deva Road, Lucknow Outer Ring Road.  Due to Priyanka's efforts, a trauma center was established in Barabanki and a college in Daryabad area of the district.

Personal life
On 5 December 2007, Rawat married Raghunath Rawat, who is an Indian Revenue Service officer of the 2007 batch. They have two daughters.

References

People from Barabanki, Uttar Pradesh
India MPs 2014–2019
Living people
Lok Sabha members from Uttar Pradesh
Women in Uttar Pradesh politics
Bharatiya Janata Party politicians from Uttar Pradesh
21st-century Indian women politicians
21st-century Indian politicians
1985 births
Politicians from Bareilly